Ana Amélia Lemos (Lagoa Vermelha, March 23, 1945) is a Brazilian journalist and politician. She worked as a columnist and commentator for RBS in Distrito Federal, before applying the Senator by the Rio Grande do Sul, elected in the General Election 2010. She was the running mate of PSDB presidential candidate Geraldo Alckmin in the 2018 election.

Biography 

Graduated in Media by the Pontifical Catholic University of Rio Grande do Sul, Lemos worked as a reporter in Journal of Commerce and the branch of Morning Post and as correspondent of the magazine Overview. She began her career in RBS in 1977, acting as a reporter for economics and producer and host of the "Economic Outlook", the first column of economics at the TV in the Southern Brazil.

In 1979, Ana Amelia moved to GMT, as a reporter for "Zero Hora", RBS TV and Radio Gaúcha. Three years later, she was named RBS's director for Brasília, a post she held until December 2003. Lemos then participated in programs like "Bom Dia Rio Grande", on TV, and Current Gaucho, Gaucho on radio, signing a column in the editorial policy of the newspaper Zero Hora.

Political career 

On March 15, 2010, Lemos announced her retirement from the RBS Group to start a political career. In her first race, she was a candidate of the Progressive Party (PP) for Senator by the state of Rio Grande do Sul, she was elected on October 3rd, 2010, with 29.54% of the votes, with more than 3,4 million votes. Since then, she has stood out in Congress: she was chosen four times as one of the ten best senators in the Congress in Focus award, in 2013 she was appointed by the Inter-Union Department of Parliamentary Advisory (Diap) as the most influential woman parliamentarian in the National Congress.

At the presidential elections of 2018 Lemos is Geraldo Alckmin's running mate.

Personal life 
Ana Amélia Lemos was married to lawyer and politician Omar Octavio Cardoso, who died in 2011.

References

1945 births
People from Rio Grande do Sul
Brazilian police officers
Members of the Federal Senate (Brazil)
Living people
Pontifical Catholic University of Rio Grande do Sul alumni
Social Democratic Party (Brazil, 2011) politicians
Brazilian women in politics

Candidates for Vice President of Brazil